Australian Town and Country Journal was a weekly English language broadsheet newspaper published in Sydney, New South Wales, from 1870 to 1919. The paper was founded by Samuel Bennett with his intention for it to be "valuable to everybody for its great amount of useful and reliable information".

The paper was known for its range of topics, dealing with domestic and foreign news as well as featuring essays on literature, science and invention.

History
The first issue of the Australian Town and Country Journal was published on 8 January 1870. The Journal ran until 25 June 1919. After 2 June 1878, when Samuel Bennett died, publication of the paper was taken over by his sons, Frank and Christopher.

Digitisation
The paper has been digitised as part of the Australian Newspapers Digitisation Program project of the National Library of Australia.

See also
List of newspapers in Australia
List of newspapers in New South Wales

References

External links

Press timeline: Select chronology of significant Australian press events to 2011 http://www.nla.gov.au/anplan/heritage/NewspaperChronology.html
The birth of the newspaper in Australia http://australia.gov.au/about-australia/australian-story/birth-of-the-newspaper
Australian Newspaper History: A Bibliography http://espace.library.uq.edu.au/eserv/UQ:9521/anb_rk.pdf
Australian Town and Country introduces 'The Dawn' http://digitisethedawn.org/australian-town-and-country-introduces-dawn

Defunct newspapers published in Sydney
1870 establishments in Australia
1919 disestablishments in Australia
Publications established in 1870
Publications disestablished in 1919